Kakinada Kaja (Telugu: కాకినాడ  కాజా) is a sweet delicacy originated from the city of Kakinada, Andhra Pradesh, India in 1891. It is different from the regular world known Khaja. It resembles a closed Tube. Tube is known as Gottam in Telugu. So it was called as Gottam Kaja. It has its own recipe. It is a major famous sweet in entire South India.   

It was made popular by a person called Chittipeddi Kotaiah which is why it is also known as Kakinada Kotaiah Kaja. As of August 2018, Government of Andhra Pradesh is said to be in the process of applying for Geographic Indication (GI) tag for this sweet. A village named Tapeswaram is near the city of Kakinada, which is also famous for another Khaja recipe known as Madatha Kaja.

History
Kakinada Kaja was originated in Kakinada when Chittipedi Kotaiah hailing from Chinaparimi village near Tenali in Guntur district (Kaja is a town in Guntur district) migrated to Kakinada town in 1891 and started a sweet shop making this sweet. From then, it was continued as a legacy and the entire generation of the family still run them from the city. It is still being sold in large numbers and people come from many parts of India to taste this sweet. Apart from this they also sell many sweets in their shop. It is also served in many cuisines in the city.

Ingredients
Refined wheat flour, sugar, and edible oils are the chief ingredients of Kaja.

Preparation
First, a paste is made out of wheat flour, mawa, and oil. It is then deep fried until crisp. A sugar syrup known as "Pakamu" is made. The crisp pastries are then soaked in the sugar syrup until they absorb it.

Varieties
The two well-known types of Kajas are Madatha Kaja and Gottam Kaja. Madatha Kajas are made of rolled-up ribbons of pastry, whereas Gottam Kajas are made of cylinders of pastry. Gottam Kajas are dry on the outside and juicy and full of sugar syrup on the inside. They melt as soon as they are put in the mouth. Madatha Kajas, on the other hand, have the same texture throughout, and become mostly dry if kept for longer than a few hours.

References

Indian desserts
Andhra cuisine
Confectionery
Kakinada